Śaṅkaranandana (fl. c. 9th or 10th century), (Tibetan: Bde byed dga’ ba) was a Mahayana Buddhist philosopher, and a Brahmin lay devotee active in Kashmir in the epistemological (pramana) tradition of Dignaga and Dharmakīrti. He was quite influential in both Kashmir and Tibet, and became known as "the second Dharmakīrti," and “the Great Brahmin.”

Śaṅkaranandana is cited by both Kashmiri Shaiva authors like Abhinavagupta and by Tibetan Buddhist authors and translators. Vincent Eltschinger states that he was "the main interlocutor of the Saiva Pratyabhijña school and as one of the most influential thinkers among the early generations of Tibetan philosophers."

Like other thinkers in his tradition, Śaṅkaranandana defended the idealistic Yogacara theory of "consciousness only" or Vijñānavāda through the logical refutation of any external objects of cognition.

Work 
Śaṅkaranandana wrote at least 17 works on logic and epistemology. Four of his works have survived in Tibetan translation, and others have survived in Sanskrit manuscripts, most incomplete or fragmentary.

According to Eltschinger his magnum opus was most likely the Prajñālaṅkāra (“Ornament of Wisdom”), which was "a systematic exposition of the Yogācāra Buddhist doctrine of mind-only (vijñaptimātratā)."

Among his other writings are four commentaries on Dharmakīrti's texts, including the Pramāṇavārttikaṭīkā, which comments on Dharmakīrti's Pramāṇavārttikasvavṛtti.

One of his surviving texts, the Īśvarāpākaraṇa-saṅkṣepa (Summary of a refutation of Īśvarā), a refutation of the Hindu concept of a creator deity, has been translated by into German in Helmut Krasser's habilitation study.

Other works include:

 Sambandhaparīkṣānusāra (translated by Parahita-bhadra and Dga’ ba’i rdo rje into Tibetan)
 Apohasiddhi translated by Manoratha and Rngog Blo ldan shes rab
Vādanyāya (a commentary on a work by Dharmakīrti)
 Pratibandhasiddhi translated by Bhavyarāja and Rngog Blo ldan shes rab
 Laghu-pratibandhasiddhi (“Short Proof of the Connection”) 
 Sūkṣmaprāmāṇya, Madhyaprāmāṇya, and Bṛhatprāmāṇya (“Short/Middle/Extensive versions of "Examination of Valid Cognition") 
 Anyāpohasiddhi (“Proof of Other-Exclusion”) 
 Dharmālaṅkāra (“Ornament of the Dharma”) 
 Sarvajñasiddhi (“Proof of all-knowledge”) 
 Svalpasarvajñasiddhi (also known as Sarvajñasiddhisaṅkṣepa, “Summary of the Proof of all-knowledge”),
 Saṅkṣipteśvarāpākaraṇa (also known as Īśvarāpākaraṇasaṅkṣepa, “Summary of the Refutation of [a Creator] God”) 
 Āgamasiddhi  (“Proof of [the Human Origin of Authoritative] Scripture”)

See also
 Pramana
 Epistemology
 Dharmakirti

References

Bibliography

10th-century Indian philosophers
10th-century Indian writers
Atheist philosophers
10th-century Buddhists
Buddhist logic
Mahayana Buddhism writers
History of logic
Indian Buddhists
Indian scholars of Buddhism
Indian logicians